In computer science and graph theory, Karger's algorithm is a randomized algorithm to compute a minimum cut of a connected graph. It was invented by David Karger and first published in 1993.

The idea of the algorithm is based on the concept of contraction of an edge  in an undirected graph . Informally speaking, the contraction of an edge merges the nodes  and  into one, reducing the total number of nodes of the graph by one. Karger's basic algorithm iteratively contracts randomly chosen edges until only two nodes remain; those nodes represent a cut in the original graph. By iterating this basic algorithm a sufficient number of times, a minimum cut can be found with high probability.

The global minimum cut problem 

A cut  in an undirected graph  is a partition of the vertices  into two non-empty, disjoint sets . The cutset of a cut consists of the edges  between the two parts. The size (or weight) of a cut in an unweighted graph is the cardinality of the cutset, i.e., the number of edges between the two parts, 
 
The minimum cut problem is to find a cut of smallest size among these cuts. 

For weighted graphs with positive edge weights  the weight of the cut is the sum of the weights  of edges between vertices in each part
 

Contraction algorithm

The fundamental operation of Karger’s algorithm is a form of edge contraction. The result of contracting the edge  is new node . In particular, the resulting graph contains no self-loops. The result of contracting edge  is denoted .

The contraction algorithm repeatedly contracts random edges in the graph, until only two nodes remain, at which point there is only a single cut. 

The key idea of the algorithm is that it is far more likely for non min-cut edges than min-cut edges to be randomly selected and lost to contraction, since min-cut edges are usually vastly outnumbered by non min-cut edges. Subsequently, it is plausible that the min-cut edges will survive all the edge contraction, and the algorithm will correctly identify the min-cut edge. 

    procedure contract():
    while 
        choose  uniformly at random
        
    return the only cut in 

Alternatively, the procedure can be viewed as an execution of Kruskal’s algorithm for constructing the minimum spanning tree in a graph where the edges have weights  according to a random permutation . Removing the heaviest edge of this tree results in two components that describe a cut. In this way, the contraction procedure can be implemented like Kruskal’s algorithm in time . 

The best known implementations use  time and space, or  time and  space, respectively.

Success probability of the contraction algorithm

In a graph  with  vertices, the contraction algorithm returns a minimum cut with polynomially small probability . Every graph has  cuts, among which at most  can be minimum cuts. Therefore, the success probability for this algorithm is much better than the probability for picking a cut at random, which is at most .

For instance, the cycle graph on  vertices has exactly  minimum cuts, given by every choice of 2 edges. The contraction procedure finds each of these with equal probability.

To further establish the lower bound on the success probability, let  denote the edges of a specific minimum cut of size . In particular, the first edge contraction avoids , which happens with probability .

Repeating the contraction algorithm

By repeating the contraction algorithm  times with independent random choices and returning the smallest cut, the probability of not finding a minimum cut is

Karger–Stein algorithm 
An extension of Karger’s algorithm due to David Karger and Clifford Stein achieves an order of magnitude improvement.

The basic idea is to perform the contraction procedure until the graph reaches  vertices.

    procedure contract():
    while 
        choose  uniformly at random
        
    return 

The probability  that this contraction procedure avoids a specific cut  in an -vertex graph is

This motivates the idea of switching to a slower algorithm  after a certain number of contraction steps.

    procedure fastmincut():
    if :
        return mincut()
    else:
        
         contract()
         contract()
        return min {fastmincut(), fastmincut()}

Analysis 

The probability  the algorithm finds a specific cutset   is given by the recurrence relation

with solution . The running time of fastmincut satisfies

with solution . This is an order of magnitude improvement over Karger’s original algorithm.

Improvement bound 
To determine a min-cut, one has to touch every edge in the graph at least once, which is  time in a dense graph.

References

Graph algorithms
Graph connectivity